Tetiana Vasylivna Yakovenko (born, May 16, 1954) is a Ukrainian poet, literary critic, and teacher. Since 1988, she has been a member of the National Writers' Union of Ukraine. Her awards include Honored Worker of Ukraine Culture (2004), and Excellent Education of Ukraine (1992).

Biography
Tetiana Yakovenko was born in the village of Sobolivka, Teplyk Raion, Vinnytsia Oblast, Ukraine, May 16, 1954. After graduating from Sobol Secondary School, she worked at a local sugar factory, taught at schools in the Teplyk Raion, and worked for the Komsomol. She graduated from Vinnytsia State Pedagogical University (VSPU) (1977), and did postgraduate studies at the Institute of Literature, Taras Shevchenko National University of Kyiv as a Candidate of Sciences, Philology (1987).

From 1983 to 2012, Yakovenko was an Associate Professor of Ukrainian literature at the Institute of Philology and Journalism, VSPU. Her research interests include history of Ukrainian literature, translation studies, and comparative studies.

Yakovenko was elected a deputy of the Vinnytsia Oblast Council, 5th convocation, and chair of the standing commission on education, culture and spiritual revival. She is also member of the Presidium of the Vinnytsia Oblast Council. For more than ten years, she managed the regional children's literary and art studio "Network". From 1999 to 2012, she served as head of the literary and artistic studio, "Sails", at VSPU . Since 2012, she has been the head of the literary and artistic studio "Slovotsvit" Vinnytsia Humanitarian and Pedagogical College. She was a member of the National Writers' Union of Ukraine Admissions Committee for more than ten years. She is the chair of the Vinnytsia Regional Local History Literary and Artistic Public Organization "Velyka Rodnya".

The first poem of the nine-year-old Yakovenko was published in 1963 in the Soviet newspaper for children and youth Зірка (Star). Thereafter, she has authored about twenty books of poetry, hundreds of publications in periodicals, several dozen prefaces to the first books of young authors of Vinnytsia Oblast, and served as a compiler of a number of regional literary almanacs, including several issues of Подільського перевесла (Podolsky oar).

Yakovenko is the author of dozens of scientific papers and manuals in the field of Ukrainian and world literature, and literary local lore. In particular, she studied the works of Yuri Klen, Leonid Mosendz, Mykhailo Stelmakh, Nikolay Nekrasov, Matsuo Bashō, Rudyard Kipling, and others, as well as the philological aspects of Scripture. Her chants of biblical books were published in journal periodicals, including The Book of the Prophet Zephaniah (2008), The Book of Ruth (2008), The book of the prophet Jonah (2008), and others. Dozens of songs based on Yakovenko's poems have been written by Vinnytsia composers Oleksandr Pilchen, Leonid Hrushevsky, Olga Yanushkevych, Andriy Shinkovych, Natalia Todosienko, Yakov Polyakhivsky and Maksym Kolesnikov (Kazakhstan).

Awards and honours

Honorary titles
 Knight of the Order of Princess Olga III degree (2013)
 Honored Worker of Ukraine Culture (2004)
 Honorary Award of the National Writers' Union of Ukraine (2004)
 Breastplate of the Ministry of Education and Science of Ukraine "Excellence in Education" (1992)
 "Person of the Year" in Vinnytsia Oblast in the category "Artist" (2010)

Literary awards
 Mykola Trublaini Literary Prize (1978)
 Crystal Cherry Literary and Artistic Prize (2001)
 All-Ukrainian Literary Prize named after Mykhailo Kotsyubynsky (2002)
 Literary Prize of the NSPU "Annunciation" (2003)
 Yevhen Gutsal All-Ukrainian Literary and Artistic Prize (2004)
 Mark Vovchko Literary and Artistic Prize (2007)
 Ivan Ogienko All-Ukrainian Prize (2008)
 Mykhailo Stelmakh Literary Prize of the Vinnytsia Region Magazine (2008)
 Ivan Koshelivets International Literary Prize (2008)
 Pavel Tychyna Literary Prize (2010)
 Anatoliy Bortnyak Literary Prize (2012)

Selected works

Collections of poetry
 Conscience, 1986
 Daily Motherland, 1990
 Self-portrait with lilies of the valley, 1992
 Premonition of grass, 1993
 Colorful night, 1998
 Heavenly Garden, 2012
 For earthly happiness, 2017 (translated into Belarusian by Belarusian authors in Ukrainian)

Collections of lyrics
 Love for your face, 1987
 The temptation of confession, 2001
 And the gold of laughter, and the silver of tears, 2006
 Live fire, 2009

Collections of hymns from the Holy Scriptures
 Psalms to David, 2002
 The book of psalms in the songs of Tatiana Yakovenko, 2003
 Song over songs in the artistic chant of Tatiana Yakovenko, 2004
 Ecclesiastes ' book in the artistic chant of Tatiana Yakovenko, 2005
 The book of the prophet Daniel in the artistic chant of Tatiana Yakovenko 2008
 Hosanna to the Lord, Hosanna!  : chants in the Ukrainian language of the Holy Scripture, 2013 (Series "Library of Literature of Vinnytsia")

Poetic tales for children
 The Tale of Julia the Bee, 2005. (Motherland shines in the heart of the daughter and son)
 The Tale of the Bear Brishka, 2005. (Motherland shines in the heart of the daughter and son)
 Sports in honor of animals, 2005. (Motherland shines in the heart of daughter and son)

Collections of works for children, co-authored with Olena Vitenko
 Podolsk pereveslechko  : a collection of children's poems", 2011
 Harvester, 2012

References

Sources

 Митці слова Вінниччини. До 45-річчя обласної організації НСПУ: довід.-хрестом. Вид. / Упоряд. А. М. Подолинний. — Вінниця: Консоль, 2015. — . — pp. 212—217.
 
 
 Сучасні письменники України : бібліографічний довідник / упор. Анатолій Гай — Київ : Київське обласне творче об'єднання «Культура» ; Біла Церква : Буква, 2011. — . p. 540.
 З-над Божої ріки. Літературний біобібліографічний словник Вінниччини / Упорядкування і загальна редакція А. М. Подолинного. — Вінниця: Континент-ПРИМ, 2001. — p. 390.
 16 May 2014 — 60 років від дня народження Тетяни Василівни Яковенко // Знаменні і пам'ятні дати Вінниччини 2014 року: хронол. довід. / уклад. О. Ю. Антонюк, Г. М. Авраменко; відповід. за вип. Н. І. Морозова; Упр. культури і туризму Вінниц. обл. держ. адмін., Вінниц. ОУНБ ім. К. А. Тімірязєва; — Вінниця: ТОВ Консоль, 2013. — p. 129–130.
 Тендітний всесвіт слова Тетяни Яковенко : до 55-річчя від дня народження : бібліогр. покажч. / Упр. культури і туризму Вінниц. облдержадмін., Вінниц. обл. універс. наук. б-ка ім. К. А. Тімірязєва; [уклад.: Т. П. Кристофорова, Г. М. Слотюк; ред. М. Г. Спиця. — Вінниця : [б. в.], 2009. — (Наші видатні земляки)]
 Сегеда, Юрій. У тендітному всесвіті Слова [Текст] : [[[Вінницька обласна універсальна наукова бібліотека імені Тимірязєва|Вінницька обласна наукова бібліотека ім. Тімірязєва]] презентувала бібліографічний покажчик «Тендітний всесвіт слова Тетяни Яковенко»] / Ю. Сегеда // Вінниччина. — 13 October 2009. — p. 4.
 Яковенко Тетяна Василівна // Подільське перевесло: Літературно-мистецький альманах. — Вип. 1. — Вінниця: ДП «ДКФ», 2008. — p. 104.
 Тетяна Яковенко // Подільські криниці: хрестоматія з літератури рідного краю. — Вінниця, 2006. — Вип. 3. — 578–603.
 Гошко, Галина. Тендітний всесвіт слова : [Поезія вінницької поетеси Т. В. Яковенко] / Г. Гошко // Крила України. — 20-25 March 2006. — [. 9.
 Яковенко, Т. Вірші : [Є коротка біографічна довідка і фото поетеси ] / Т. Яковенко // Краса України : Твори поетів і фотохудожників Вінницької, Тернопільської та Хмельницької областей про рідне Поділля]. — Вінниця : ДП ДКФ, 2006. — p. 157–158.
 Тетяна Яковенко [Текст] : [поетеса, є коротка біографія, вірш] // Миле серцю Поділля : поетична антологія / уклад. В. Сторожук. — Вінниця, 2006. — p. 124. — Зміст: Соболівська екзотика Т. В. Яковенко.
 Червінчук, І. «Без поетес — світ без чудес». На полудень віку чарівній Тетяні Яковенко вручили премію ім. Євгена Гуцала [Текст] / І. Червінчук // 33 канал. — 2 June 2004. — p. 6.
 Степовик, Д. Пісня Божественної любові [Текст] : [Книга Т. В. Яковенко «Пісня над піснями»] / Д. Степовик // Вінницький край. — 2004. — No. 3. — p. 146–150.
 Бортняк, А. Духовне подвижництво Тетяни Яковенко // Подолія. — 22 January 2003.
 Кротенко, М. «Спокуса сповіді» Тетяни Яковенко [Текст] / М. Кротенко // Згар. — 2002. — No. 2. — p. 93-96.
 Прізвища лауреатів названо : [Лауреатами Всеукраїнської літературної премії імені М.Коцюбинського стали Тетяна Яковенко та Валерій Лазаренко] // Правозахисник. — 2002. — No. 6. — p. 22.
 Бортняк, А. Як важко обніматися крильми… // Зоряна криниця. — 27 March 1999.
 Бортняк, А. Золота мука любові // Вінницька газета. 12 February 1993.
 Вовкодав, В. Повінчана з Поділлям // Комсомольське плем'я. — 16 July 1989.
 Листопад, М. Світло й тіні сповіді // Комсомольське плем'я. — 26 February 1987.
 Нахлік, Е. Дебют, якого чекали // Дніпро. — 1986. — No. 11.

1954 births
Living people
People from Vinnytsia Oblast
20th-century Ukrainian poets
21st-century Ukrainian poets
20th-century Ukrainian women writers
21st-century Ukrainian women writers
Ukrainian educators
Ukrainian literary critics
Ukrainian women poets